is a 1986 Japanese direct-to-video animation written by Toshimichi Suzuki. Kenichi Sonoda created the character designs of the animated version.

Voice actors 
Eriko Hara as Miki Morita
Miki Takahashi as Eri Kazama
Shūichi Ikeda as Tetsuma Kidō
Akio Nojima as Oki Sonoda
Eiko Yamada as Bloody Matsuki
Urara Takano as Buster Horiguchi
Shōzō Iizuka as Dr. Sawada
Yūsaku Yara as Joe Taguchi
Demon Kogure as himself

Music 
 "Adam's Apple" (アダムの林檎) by Seikima-II (insert song)
 "Music (I Love You ga Kasurete)" by Saori Saito (ending theme)

External links 
 
 

1986 anime OVAs
Animated comedy films
Anime International Company
Central Park Media
Comedy anime and manga
Direct-to-video animated films
Direct-to-video science fiction films
Japanese animated science fiction films
Wrestling in anime and manga
1986 films